Saproscincus mustelinus, commonly known as the southern weasel skink or weasel shadeskink, is a small species of skink which is endemic to Australia.

Behavior
S. mustelinus is usually nocturnal, but is most active in the evening and warm mornings.

Diet
S. mustelinus hunts and feeds on small insects and other small invertebrates.

Description

Defensive behavior
If frightened this skink has the ability to lose its tail as a defence mechanism; the tail lies on the ground twitching, distracting the predator so the skink can escape.

Habitat

The southern weasel skink tends to utilize existing vegetation and fallen timber for shelter.

Geographic range
The southern weasel skink's distribution forms a coastal strip from south Victoria to southern Queensland.

Reproduction
Females lay up to four eggs per clutch in a communal nest. The nests are normally a dugout, a burrow, which contain the eggs of numerous females. Laying normally occurs between spring and late summer.

References

Further reading
Boulenger GA (1887). Catalogue of the Lizards in the British Museum (Natural History). Second Edition. Volume III. ... Scincidæ ... London: Trustees of the British Museum (Natural History). (Taylor and Francis, printers). xii + 575 pp. + Plates I-XL. (Lygosoma mustelinum, p. 267 + Plate XIX, figures 2, 2a).
O'Shaughnessy AWE (1874). "Descriptions of new Species of Scincidæ in the Collection of the British Museum". Ann. Mag. Nat. Hist., Fourth Series 13: 298–301. (Mocoa mustelina, new species, p. 299).

External links

Saproscincus
Reptiles described in 1874
Skinks of Australia
Taxa named by Arthur William Edgar O'Shaughnessy